Kenneth ("Ken") Stanley David Wilmshurst (9 April 1931 – 3 October 1992) was an Olympic athlete from England.

Athletics career
He specialised in the long jump and triple jump events during his career. Born in Calcutta, West Bengal (India), Wilmshurst represented Great Britain at the 1956 Olympic Games for which he also served as athletics captain. He claimed gold medals for England in the men's long jump and triple jump events at the 1954 British Empire and Commonwealth Games in Vancouver, British Columbia, Canada. He died in Cobham, Surrey, aged 61.

He represented England and won double gold in the long jump and triple jump at the 1954 British Empire and Commonwealth Games in Vancouver, Canada. Four years later he represented England in the long jump and triple jump at the 1958 British Empire and Commonwealth Games in Cardiff, Wales.

He was the series champion, in The Krypton Factor on ITV in 1978.

References

1931 births
1992 deaths
Athletes from Kolkata
English male long jumpers
British male triple jumpers
English male triple jumpers
Olympic athletes of Great Britain
Athletes (track and field) at the 1956 Summer Olympics
Commonwealth Games gold medallists for England
Commonwealth Games medallists in athletics
Athletes (track and field) at the 1954 British Empire and Commonwealth Games
Medallists at the 1954 British Empire and Commonwealth Games